The 1920 Rhondda West by-election was a parliamentary by-election held on 21 December 1920 for the British House of Commons constituency of Rhondda West in Wales.

The seat had become vacant when the constituency's Labour Member of Parliament (MP), William Abraham, resigned from Parliament.  He had held the seat since its creation at the 1918 general election, when he was returned unopposed. He had been the MP for the previous Rhondda constituency from its creation for the 1885 general election.

The result of the contest was a victory for the Labour candidate, William John, who won with a majority of 4,076 votes over Gwilym Rowlands.  Rowlands described himself as "Labour in the Conservative interest", but was an official Conservative Party candidate.

John represented the constituency until he retired from the House of Commons at the 1950 general election.

See also
Rhondda West (UK Parliament constituency)
1967 Rhondda West by-election
Rhondda
Lists of United Kingdom by-elections

References

Further reading
 
 

By-elections to the Parliament of the United Kingdom in Welsh constituencies
Rhondda West by-election
Rhondda West by-election
1920s elections in Wales
Rhondda West by-election
History of Rhondda Cynon Taf